American Terri Farley is an American writer. She is the best-selling author of Seven Tears into the Sea, The Phantom Stallion series for young readers about the contemporary and historic West and many nonfiction magazine articles.

Biography
Farley grew up in Southern California and lives in the foothills of the Sierra Nevada in Verdi, Nevada, with her journalist and former KSGG 1230 AM radio talk show host husband Cory and her pets. She has worked as a waitress, journalist, teacher of remedial English and now writes books full-time. She received the Silver Pen Award from the University of Nevada in 2010 and was inducted into the Nevada Writers Hall of Fame in November 2017. Her 2015 book Wild at Heart: Mustangs and Young People Fighting to Save Them documenting the plight of wild horses in the West, published by Houghton-Mifflin-Harcourt, was selected as a Junior Literary Guild Selection as well as winner of the Sterling North Heritage award for Excellence in Children's Literature. It was also recommended by the American Association for the Advancement of Science, and a finalist for Best Western Juvenile Nonfiction by the Western Writers of America She is a founding member of the Society of Children's Book Writers and Illustrators' mentor program. Her Phantom Stallion series has sold more than one million copies. Seven Tears into the Sea, also very popular, was nominated for the ALA Best Books for Young Adults Award.

Books

The Phantom Stallion series
 The Wild One
 Mustang Moon
 Dark Sunshine
 The Renegade
 Free Again
 The Challenger
 Desert Dancer
 Golden Ghost
 Gift Horse
 Red Feather Filly
 Untamed
 Rain Dance
 Heartbreak Bronco
 Moonrise
 Kidnapped Colt
 The Wildest Heart
 Mountain Mare
 Firefly
 Secret Star
 Blue Wings
 Dawn Runner
 Wild Honey
 Gypsy Gold
 Run Away Home

Phantom Stallion: Wild Horse Island series
Farley has recently announced that she has signed a 16-book contract and released several titles for upcoming books.

 The Horse Charmer (May 22, 2007)
 The Shining Stallion (August 21, 2007)
 Rain Forest Rose (November 2007)
 Castaway Colt (January 2008)
 Fire Maiden (March 2008)
 Sea Shadow (May 2008)
 Mist Walker (July 2008)
 Water Lilly (September 2008)
 Snowfire (October 20, 2008)
 Faraway Filly (December 23, 2008)
 Galloping Gold (March 2009) last book in series

Magical Love series
 Sea Spell
 Blue Rain

Haunting Hearts series
 Shadows in the Flame
 Snow in Summer

Other
 Seven Tears into the Sea
 Tumbleweed Heart
 Star of Wonder also by Jo Beverley, Alice Alfonsi, and Kate Freiman

References

External links
Official website
Terri Farley at HarperCollins

Novelists from Nevada
Living people
San Jose State University alumni
University of Nevada, Reno alumni
American women novelists
American writers of young adult literature
Women writers of young adult literature
21st-century American novelists
21st-century American women writers
People from Washoe County, Nevada
Year of birth missing (living people)